Wengania is a non-differentaited, non-mineralized algal thallus under a millimeter in diameter.

References

Fossil algae